Joseph Isiah "Joe" Efford (born August 29, 1996) is an American professional soccer player who plays as a winger for Scottish side Motherwell.

Club career

Early career 
Efford graduated from Dacula High School in 2014. After he finished freshman orientation at the University of North Carolina at Greensboro, he passed up a college soccer scholarship and opted for a professional career in Europe.

Botoșani 
He went through several trials in Romania, before landing a contract with Liga I side FC Botoșani in June 2014. His contract, however, was terminated in July 2014.

Mallorca 
He left Romania to undergo a new series of tryouts in Spain, eventually ending up training with Segunda División side RCD Mallorca. After convincing Los Bermellones of his worth during two-week trial, he signed a contract with the club in September 2014. However, problems with his visa kept him effectively out of the team for 7 months before he was eventually cleared to play. In his two seasons with the club, he only managed to appear in one match.

Ergotelis 
In September 2017, Efford went on trial with Greek Football League side Ergotelis and earned a contract. He received the no. 9 jersey and scored on his debut on October 25, 2017, in a 2−4 home loss to Superleague club Xanthi in the Greek Cup. On March 5, 2018, in his twelfth league appearance for the club, Efford scored his first two goals in a 0−3 away win against AO Chania−Kissamikos. He also provided the assist for teammate Hugo Cuypers' goal in the 13th minute. Efford followed this with an early goal against Panachaiki on March 8. He scored a second brace on April 1, 2018, in a 5−1 victory over Panegialios.

Efford quickly became the focal point of Ergotelis' attack in the 2018–19 season, finishing as top-scorer for the club with 11 goals. During the following season, Efford scored his first professional hat trick on January 13, 2020, and moved up to second place on Ergotelis's list of all-time top scorers in professional competitions with 31 goals.

Waasland-Beveren 
When Efford's contract with Ergotelis expired in the summer of 2020, he was heavily linked with Greek giants Panathinaikos, but instead he signed a three-year contract with Belgian First Division side Waasland-Beveren on July 20, 2020.

Motherwell 
On January 29, 2022, Motherwell announced the signing of Efford for an undisclosed fee from Waasland-Beveren on a contract until the summer of 2023.

Career statistics

References

External links
 

1996 births
Living people
American soccer players
American expatriate sportspeople in Spain
American expatriate sportspeople in Greece
American expatriate sportspeople in Belgium
Expatriate footballers in Spain
Expatriate footballers in Greece
Expatriate footballers in Belgium
RCD Mallorca players
Ergotelis F.C. players
S.K. Beveren players
Motherwell F.C. players
Super League Greece 2 players
Belgian Pro League players
Association football forwards
Soccer players from Georgia (U.S. state)
American expatriate sportspeople in Scotland
Expatriate footballers in Scotland